Pavao Muhić (1 January 1811 - 17 October 1897) was a Croatian lawyer and politician.

He was born in Požega. He taught as a professor of political science and cameralism at the School of the Royal Academy of Science (1835-1850) and at the Law Academy (1850-1871), where he also served as a director. He was a member of the Croatian Parliament in 1861-1866, and the Head of the Department for Education and Religious Affairs of the Provincial Government of Croatia, Slavonia and Dalmatia in 1872-1881. He was a regular member of the Yugoslav Academy of Sciences and Arts since 1866, and its president in 1888.

He died in Zagreb.

References

Croatian lawyers
Croatian politicians
1811 births
1897 deaths
Members of the Croatian Academy of Sciences and Arts
People from Požega, Croatia